Kurigram-3 is a constituency represented in the Jatiya Sangsad (National Parliament) of Bangladesh since 2019 by MA Matin of the Awami League.

Boundaries 
The constituency encompasses Ulipur Upazila.

History 
The constituency was created in 1984 from the Rangpur-16 constituency when the former Rangpur District was split into five districts: Nilphamari, Lalmonirhat, Rangpur, Kurigram, and Gaibandha.

Ahead of 2008 general election, the Election Commission redrew constituency boundaries to reflect population changes revealed by the 2001 Bangladesh census. The 2008 redistricting altered the boundaries of the constituency.

Ahead of the 2014 general election, the Election Commission altered the boundaries of the constituency by removing one union parishad of Ulipur Upazila: Saheber Alga, and four union parishads of Rajarhat Upazila: Bidyananda, Gharialdanga, Nazimkhan, and Omar Majid, and adding all but two union parishads of Chilmari Upazila: Ashtamir Char and Nayerhat.

Ahead of the 2018 general election, the Election Commission altered the boundaries of the constituency by removing all portions of Chilmari Upazila, and adding the only missing union parishad of Ulipur Upazila: Saheber Alga.

Members of Parliament

Elections

Elections in the 2010s 
AKM Maidul Islam died in May 2018. Akkas Ali was elected in a July by-election.

AKM Maidul Islam was elected unopposed in the 2014 general election after opposition parties withdrew their candidacies in a boycott of the election.

Elections in the 2000s

Elections in the 1990s 
Hussain Muhammad Ershad stood from jail for five seats in the June 1996 general election: Rangpur-2, Rangpur-3, Rangpur-5, Rangpur-6, and Kurigram-3. After winning all five, he chose to represent Rangpur-3 and quit the other four, triggering by-elections in them.

References

External links
 

Parliamentary constituencies in Bangladesh
Kurigram District